Nissaboury was co-founders of the magazine Anfas/Souffles

Mostafa Nissaboury (born in Casablanca in 1943) is a Moroccan poetand was a co-founder of the magazine Anfas/Souffles ("Breaths") with Abdellatif Laabi. Nissaboury was an essays, poetry writer. The magazine Souffles was banned in 1971.

In an interview in 2016 with Le360,when he was asked about the magazine's political stances, he declared he was no longer part of the magazine staff at the time.

In 1964, alongside Mohammed Khaïr-Eddine, Nissaboury wrote the manifest "Poésie Toute," an important milestone in the history of Moroccan literature. In Casablanca, he opened a house solely devoted to poetry. His works greatly contributed to the renewal of Moroccan poetry.

References

External links
 Poems by Mostafa Nissaboury in New Poetry in Translation
 The poem "It is a city" by Mostafa Nissaboury in Drunken Boat

20th-century Moroccan poets
Moroccan writers in French
1943 births
People from Casablanca
Living people
21st-century Moroccan poets